Rosa xanthina, the yellow rose or Manchu rose, is a species of flowering plant in the family Rosaceae, native to China, Mongolia, and Korea. Its cultivar 'Canary Bird' has gained the Royal Horticultural Society's Award of Garden Merit.

References

xanthina
Flora of South-Central China
Flora of North-Central China
Flora of Qinghai
Flora of Manchuria
Flora of Inner Mongolia
Flora of Mongolia
Flora of Korea
Plants described in 1820